Christopher Zeller (born 14 September 1984) is a German national representative field hockey player. As of 2008, his current club is Rot-Weiss Köln. Zeller represented Germany in the 2004, 2008 and 2012 Summer Olympics.

Born in Munich, he is the younger brother of Philipp Zeller. Zeller was a member of the Men's National Team that won the gold medal at the 2008 Summer Olympics and scored the only goal in the final. Two years earlier, he also won the 2006 Men's Hockey World Cup where he scored two goals in the final match and was chosen as the Most Promising Player of the tournament.

Zeller played in the gold medal match for field hockey at the 2012 Olympics which Germany won.

References

The Official Website of the Beijing 2008 Olympic Games
Official website of the Zeller brothers

External links
 
 
 
 

1984 births
Living people
German male field hockey players
Olympic field hockey players of Germany
Field hockey players at the 2004 Summer Olympics
Field hockey players at the 2008 Summer Olympics
Olympic gold medalists for Germany
Olympic bronze medalists for Germany
Olympic medalists in field hockey
Field hockey players at the 2012 Summer Olympics
Medalists at the 2012 Summer Olympics
Medalists at the 2008 Summer Olympics
Medalists at the 2004 Summer Olympics
HC Bloemendaal players
21st-century German people
2006 Men's Hockey World Cup players
2014 Men's Hockey World Cup players